Ausenium (atomic symbol Ao) was the name assigned to the element with atomic number 93, now known as neptunium.  It was named after a Greek name of Italy, Ausonia.

The same team assigned the name hesperium to element 94, after Hesperia, a poetic name of Italy. (Element 94 was later named plutonium).

The discovery of the element, now discredited, was made by Enrico Fermi and a team of scientists at the University of Rome in 1934. In the same year Ida Noddack had already presented alternative explanations for the experimental results of Fermi. Following the discovery of nuclear fission in 1938, it was realized that Fermi's discovery was actually a mixture of barium, krypton, and other elements.  The actual element was discovered several years later, and assigned the name neptunium.

Fascist authorities wanted one of the elements to be named littorio after the Roman lictores who carried the fasces, a symbol appropriated by Fascism.

References

Element name etymologies. Retrieved February 23, 2010.
 Nobel Prize Presentation Speech given by Professor H. Pleijel, Chairman of the Nobel Committee for Physics on December 10, 1938
Enrico Fermi, Artificial radioactivity produced by neutron bombardment, Nobel Lecture, December 12, 1938.

1934 introductions
Science and technology in Italy
Neptunium
Misidentified chemical elements